Asura biseriata is a moth of the family Erebidae. It is found on Borneo. The habitat consists of  lowland areas.

References

biseriata
Moths described in 1900
Moths of Asia